Salt rock or Salt Rock may refer to:

Rock salt
Salt Rock, town in South Africa
Salt Rock, West Virginia, USA
Salt Rock Township, Marion County, Ohio, USA
Salt Rock State Campground, park in Connecticut, USA
Ezra Millington "Salt Rock" Midkiff, American baseball player
Saltrock, a surfwear company
Salt rock lamp, a lamp made of Himalayan salt